Pas în doi, also known as Paso Doble, is a 1985 Romanian film directed by Dan Pița. It stars Claudiu Bleonț, Petre Nicolae, Anda Onesa and Ecaterina Nazare. It was entered into the 36th Berlin International Film Festival where it won an Honourable Mention.

Synopsis
The film tells the story of a man who falls in love with two very different women.

Cast
 Claudiu Bleonț as Mihai
 Petre Nicolae as Ghiță
 Ecaterina Nazare as Maria
 Anda Onesa as Monica
 Mircea Andreescu as Meșterul Anton
 Valentin Popescu as Iulian
 Aurora Leonte as Felicia
 Adrian Titieni as Dodo
 Tudorel Filimon as Bob
 Camelia Maxim as Nineta
 Cornel Revent as Pricop
 Lucreția Maier as Eleonora
 Virgil Andriescu as Virgil
 Christian Maurer as Directorul
 Mircea Constantinescu 
 Romeo Pop
 Miruna Birău
 Claudiu Istodor
 Iulia Boroș
 Manuela Ciucur
 Ruxandra Bucescu

References

External links

1985 films
1985 drama films
1980s Romanian-language films
Films directed by Dan Pița
Romanian drama films